Nicolas Jacquin (or Nicolas Philibert; 1700 – 21 January 1748) was a Canadian merchant trader and the hero of 
William Kirby's The Golden Dog.

References

1700 births
1748 deaths
Canadian merchants